Tin Lizzies (or Old-timers ; "De Oude Tuffer" in Dutch) is a car ride in the amusement park Efteling in the Netherlands. The attraction was designed by Joop Geesink and built by Mack Rides, and started operating in 1984.

History and details
In this junior ride passengers take place in a Ford Model T that are guided over a metal rail which is mounted in the ground. There is some need for steering to make the ride as smooth as possible, while passing a creek, trees and flower beds.

The ride is based on the Whip by William F. Mangels.

Speed: 6.5 km/h
Ride length: 590 m in 6 min. 
Number of Flivvers: 17 (capacity of 4) 
Ride capacity: 1200 passengers per hour

References
 Efteling site

Efteling
Amusement rides manufactured by Mack Rides
Amusement rides introduced in 1984